Auratonota petalocrossa is a species of moth of the family Tortricidae. It is found in Ecuador.

The wingspan is about 26–28 mm. The ground colour of the forewings is slightly darker than related species Auratonota petalocrossa. Furthermore, the dorsal blotches are much larger.

References

Moths described in 2000
Auratonota
Moths of South America